Međuvođe is a village in the municipality of Dubica in Republika Srpska, Bosnia and Herzegovina.

References

Populated places in Dubica, Bosnia and Herzegovina